Norbert Wagner (born 15 January 1939) is a retired German football manager.

References

1939 births
Living people
German football managers
SG Union Solingen managers
Freiburger FC managers
SC Freiburg managers
SC Paderborn 07 managers
Alemannia Aachen managers